Simon the Sorcerer: Who'd Even Want Contact?!, also known as Simon the Sorcerer 5, is an adventure game developed by Silver Style Entertainment. It was released in 2009 Microsoft Windows. The game is no longer available to download as the company who published went into insolvency.

Reception 
Jack Allin, on Adventure Gamers, gave the game 4.5 stars out of 5, praising the interesting locations and art style, but criticising the mediocre humour and forgettable characters.

External links

References

2009 video games
Adventure games
Point-and-click adventure games
Simon the Sorcerer
Video games developed in Germany
Windows games
Windows-only games
Video game sequels
Single-player video games
Silver Style Entertainment games